is a Japanese football player. She plays for Mynavi Sendai and Japan national team.

Club career
Ichise was born in Tokushima on August 4, 1997. After graduating from high school, she joined Vegalta Sendai (later Mynavi Vegalta Sendai) in 2016.

National team career
Ichise played for Japan U-17 national team at 2014 U-17 World Cup and Japan U-20 national team at 2016 U-20 World Cup. Japan won the championship at U-17 World Cup and 3rd place at U-20 World Cup. On April 9, 2017, she debuted for Japan national team against Costa Rica. In 2018, she played for 2018 Asian Cup and Japan won the championship. She played 15 games for Japan.

National team statistics

References

External links

Japan Football Association

1997 births
Living people
People from Tokushima (city)
Association football people from Tokushima Prefecture
Japanese women's footballers
Japan women's international footballers
Nadeshiko League players
Mynavi Vegalta Sendai Ladies players
Women's association football defenders
2019 FIFA Women's World Cup players